Pierre Bertaux (8 October 1907 in Lyon – 14 August 1986 in Saint-Cloud, Hauts-de-Seine) was a noted French resistance fighter and scholar of German literature. While holding administrative positions, he also wrote on Friedrich Hölderlin. He participated in the French resistance in Toulouse, where he imposed Charles De Gaulle's authority during the liberation of France. After the war he was a high-ranking police officer.

In 1968 he founded a Department of German Language and Literature at the New Sorbonne in Asnières. In 1970 he received the Goethe Medal, and in 1975 the Heinrich Heine prize of the city of Düsseldorf.
He had three sons, two of whom have become renowned academics on their own right: Daniel Bertaux and Jean-Loup Bertaux.

Work 
French
Hölderlin, Essai de biographie intérieure, Paris, Hachette, 1936 
La mutation humaine, 1964
La libération de Toulouse et de sa région, éd. Hachette, 1973
Hölderlin ou le temps d'un poète, Paris, Gallimard, 1983
Mémoires interrompus par Pierre Bertaux, Hansgerd Schulte, Presses Sorbonne Nouvelle, 2000 
Un normalien à Berlin, lettres 1927 1933

German
 Friedrich Hölderlin. Frankfurt/Main 1981 und 2000
 Hölderlin und die Französische Revolution. Frankfurt/Main 1969, Berlin 1990
 Afrika. Von der Vorgeschichte bis zu den Staaten der Gegenwart. Frankfurt/M. 1966
 Mutation der Menschheit - Diagnosen und Prognosen. Frankfurt/M. 1963

External links

References 

1907 births
1986 deaths
Germanists
Senators of French Sudan